Glaspie is a surname. Notable people with the surname include:

 Andrew Bird Glaspie (1876–1943), American politician and college football coach
 April Glaspie (born 1942), American diplomat
 Nikki Glaspie (born 1983), American drummer

See also
 Gillespie (disambiguation)
 Gillespie (surname)